Sheikh Makan Fort is a historical site in Sheykh Makan village in Darreh Shahr County, Ilam Province, Iran. The fort was constructed in Sasanian Empire. The fort was registered on Iran National Sites on March 8, 2003.

References

Castles in Iran
Sasanian castles
Forts in Iran